Cwmann is a small village in Wales near Lampeter, just on the Ceredigion border with Carmarthenshire, in the community of Pencarreg. Cwmann is on the Carmarthenshire side of the border. the population in 2011 was around 872.

Cwmann is home to the Cwmanne Tavern.
Cwmann sits on the banks of the River Teifi (known in Welsh as "Afon Teifi"). Lampeter is situated the other side.

References

External links
www.geograph.co.uk : photos of Cwmann and surrounding area
St James Church

Villages in Carmarthenshire